KENET, Kenya Education Network, is Kenya's National research and education network (NREN). KENET is licensed by the Communications Authority of Kenya (CA) as a not-for-profit operator serving the education and research institutions.

References

External links

1999 establishments in Kenya
Communications in Kenya
National research and education networks